Jihad Qassab (13 July 1975 – 30 September 2016) was a Syrian professional football defender who played for Al-Karamah and Syria national football team.

Career
Qassab played for his hometown club, Al-Karamah, winning four consecutive league titles and reaching the 2006 AFC Champions League Final, only losing to Jeonbuk Motors 2–3 on aggregate.

Qassab played in Lebanon for Al-Ahed and Shabab Al-Sahel, and in the U.A.E. for Ajman Club.

Death
Qassab was arrested on 19 August 2014 in Baba Amr, Homs by the Syrian authorities during the Syrian civil war. Reports claim he was executed in the Saidnaya prison on Friday, 30 September 2016.

References

External links
Jihad Qassab

1975 births
2016 deaths
Syrian footballers
Association football defenders
Syria international footballers
Sportspeople from Homs
Al-Karamah players
Al Ahed FC players
Ajman Club players
People executed by Syria
Syrian expatriate footballers
Expatriate footballers in Lebanon
Syrian expatriate sportspeople in Lebanon
Shabab Al Sahel FC players
Lebanese Premier League players
Syrian Premier League players